Channa Mereya means "the light of my soul". 

Channa Mereya may also refer to:

 Channa Mereya, a song from the 2016 Indian film Ae Dil Hai Mushkil
 Channa Mereya (film), a 2017 Indian romance film
 Channa Mereya (TV series), a 2022 Indian television series